This is a comprehensive discography of Sentenced, a Finnish metal band.

Studio albums

Compilation albums

EPs

Live albums

Demos

Split albums

Singles

Video albums

Music videos

References

External links
 Sentenced - official website

Heavy metal group discographies
Discographies of Finnish artists